Derrycrin or Derrychrin (perhaps ), is a small village in County Tyrone, Northern Ireland. It is part of the parish of Ballinderry and is near the western shore of Lough Neagh. The Ballinderry River is a short distance north of the village and marks the boundary between counties Tyrone and Londonderry.

Education
Derrycrin Primary is the local Catholic primary school which caters to children aged four to 11.

Nearby secondary schools include:
 St. Mary's, Magherafelt
 Rainey Endowed, Magherafelt
 St Pius', Magherafelt
 Sperrin Integrated, Magherafelt
 Holy Trinity, Cookstown
 Cookstown High School
 Magherafelt High School

Sport
Gaelic football and camogie are the biggest sports in Derrycrin and Ballinderry. The local GAA club is the Ballinderry Shamrocks.

See also
Derrycrin (Conyngham)
Derrycrin (Eglish)

References

Villages in County Tyrone